Tetrakis(acetonitrile)copper(I) hexafluorophosphate is a salt with the formula [Cu(CH3CN)4]PF6. It is a colourless solid that is used in the synthesis of other copper complexes. The cation [Cu(CH3CN)4]+ is a well-known example of a transition metal nitrile complex.

Structure
As confirmed by X-ray crystallographic studies, the copper(I) ion is coordinated to four almost linear acetonitrile ligands in a nearly ideal tetrahedral geometry.  Similar complexes with other anions including the perchlorate, tetrafluoroborate, and nitrate are known.

Synthesis
The cation was first reported in 1923 with a nitrate anion as a byproduct of the reduction of silver nitrate with a suspension of copper powder in acetonitrile. [Cu(CH3CN)4]PF6 is generally produced by the addition of HPF6 to a suspension of copper(I) oxide in acetonitrile:
Cu2O + 2 HPF6 + 8 CH3CN → 2 [Cu(CH3CN)4]PF6 + H2O
The reaction is highly exothermic, and may bring the solution to a boil. Upon crystallization, the resulting microcrystals should be white, though a blue tinge is common, indicating the presence of Cu2+ impurities.

Reactions and applications
The acetonitrile ligands protect the Cu+ ion from oxidation to Cu2+, but are rather poorly bound: with other counterions, the complex forms di- and tri-acetonitrilo complexes and is also a useful source of unbound Cu(I).  

Water-immiscible organic nitriles have been shown to selectively extract Cu(I) from aqueous chloride solutions. Through this method, copper can be separated from a mixture of other metals.  Dilution of acetonitrile solutions with water induces disproportionation:
2 [Cu(CH3CN)4]+ + 6 H2O → [Cu(H2O)6]2+ + Cu + 8 CH3CN

References

Copper complexes
Hexafluorophosphates